Mesta Machinery was a leading industrial machinery manufacturer based in the Pittsburgh area town of West Homestead, Pennsylvania. It was founded in 1898 by George Mesta when he merged his machine shop with another. Mesta "machines" can be found in factories throughout the world and as of 1984 had equipment in 500 steel mills.  Mesta was the 488th largest American company in 1958 and the 414th largest in 1959.

President Mesta
By 1919 Mesta employed 3,000 at West Homestead and manufactured everything from ship propeller shafts to giant turbines for power plants and dams. In 1917, George's wife Perle Mesta wrote that the works "was a thrilling site, spread over many acres on the banks of the Monongahela." George Mesta died in 1925.

President Wahr
Harry F. Wahr was the handpicked successor to Mesta and his nephew. Wahr committed suicide in 1930.

President Iversen
Lorenz Iversen took over the company in 1930, leading it until December 31, 1963. One of the first things Iversen accomplished in the early 1930s was to buy Perle Mesta's controlling preferred stock, effectively buying the company from her. Iversen was a native of Denmark and immigrated to the US. He worked in a factory in New Jersey before returning to Denmark to get his degree in engineering, then worked at Mesta as a draftsman in 1903. Prior to 1930 he became chief engineer and held patents on devices integral to every machine manufactured by Mesta, allowing him to establish $4 million trusts ($ today) for each of his five children by 1932. Mesta won the contract to build the Mon Valley Works–Irvin Plant for U.S. Steel in 1934.

Management style
Iversen was described by many former employees as the glue that held Mesta together. In the 1930s he won a large contract with a steel manufacturer by foregoing the company's standard fee in exchange for a share of the profits of the manufactured mill. He would regularly cheer on his workers and had a ritual of standing on a hastily made stage every time Mesta won a new contract and exclaiming: "We got this job because you’re the best mechanics in the world!" He often had face-to-face talks with employees and would work the factory floor on weekends, holidays and Christmas, asking workers about new babies or ailing family members. Mesta workers repeatedly voted down efforts to unionize the factory despite its proximity to unionized steel mills including the (infamous in labor history) Homestead Mill. Iversen credited his employment policy based on human relations as the chief reason his workers rejected unionization. A month after his death in 1967 (and four years after he stepped down as president) Mesta was unionized.

World War II
Mesta's West Homestead plant was a center for WWII production. It earned the Army-Navy E Award, and was one of seven factories to earn six stars. Mesta specialized in manufacturing 16-inch naval guns, ship-propeller shafts, artillery carriages and "Long Toms" 155-mm cannons. Iversen personally oversaw the production of "Little David", a 36-inch bore mortar that was put into production for the canceled Japanese invasion. During the war, Iversen transformed Mesta into one of the nation's top ordnance suppliers, personally working 18-hour shifts in the factory. His accounting department also ran two 8-hour shifts per day.

Mesta, and later Iverson, operated the Hays Army Ammunition Plant from the 1940s through the 1960s.

Post war success

The company manufactured a 50,000 ton press (the "fifty") as part of the Heavy Press Program, initially owned by the Air Force in 1952 and operated by Alcoa, which purchased it outright in 1982. The press manufactures structural components for aircraft such as the 747 and DC-10 jetliners. After being taken out of service due to cracking in the structure, it was refurbished over three years at a cost of $100 million, and returned to service in 2012.

Khrushchev Visit
In September 1959, Nikita Khrushchev visited the Mesta Machinery Co. factory on his tour of the U.S., where he received a cigar from a worker.

Demise
Mesta filed for bankruptcy in February 1983, and most of its West Homestead works was sold off in June 1983.  The company's last assets were sold in April 1988. The property in West Homestead where Mesta Machinery was located is (as of 2018) mostly occupied by Whemco Steel Castings.  Whemco manufactures heavy industrial equipment, much like the products of the former Mesta Machinery.

A spin-off company called Mestek briefly had some success.

References

Further reading

Defunct companies based in Pennsylvania
Manufacturing companies based in Pittsburgh
Manufacturing companies established in 1898